Benjamin Vomáčka (born 27 June 1978 in Liberec) is a Czech football player who currently plays for FC Baník Ostrava.

External links 
 
 

1978 births
Living people
Czech footballers
Czech First League players
Bohemians 1905 players
SK Slavia Prague players
FC Viktoria Plzeň players
MŠK Žilina players
FC Baník Ostrava players
Slovak Super Liga players
Expatriate footballers in Slovakia
Sportspeople from Liberec
Association football defenders